List of notable people who were born or settled in Thiruvananthapuram (Trivandrum), Kerala.

Former rulers of Travancore 
 Marthanda Varma
 Sethu Lakshmi Bayi
 Dharma Raja
 Ayilyam Thirunal
Swathi Thirunal Rama Varma
 Moolam Thirunal
 Chithira Thirunal Balarama Varma

Religion and spirituality
 Ayyankali
 Sri M
 Vakkom Moulavi
 Sree Narayana Guru
 Chattampi Swamikal
 Sade Guru Shivalingadasa Swamigal

Freedom fighters
 Vakkom Abdul Khader
 Annie Mascarene

Politicians
 Shashi Tharoor
 Vakkom Purushothaman
 Varkala Radhakrishnan
 K. Muraleedharan
 A. Sampath
 V. S. Sivakumar
 Kadakampally Surendran
 K S Sabarinathan
 G Karthikeyan
 M. Vijayakumar
 C. Jayan Babu
 Neelalohithadasan Nadar
 O. Rajagopal
 Arya Rajendran

Musicians
 Swathithirunal
 B. Sasikumar
 K. S. Chithra
 M. Jayachandran
 Bichu Thirumala
 Hariharan 
 L. Athira Krishna - violinist
 Vidhu Prathap
 M. G. Radhakrishnan - music director and vocalist
 M. G. Sreekumar
 Neyyattinkara Vasudevan 
 V. Madhusoodanan Nair
 G. Venugopal
 Balabhaskar
 Job Kurian
 Ishaan Dev
 Jassie Gift
 Prince Rama Varma
 Najim Arshad
 Abhaya Hiranmayi
 Akhila Anand
 Raftaar (rapper)
 Vinayak Sasikumar
 Vishnu Vijay

Painters
 A. Ramachandran
 Raja Ravi Varma

Sculptor
 Kanayi Kunhiraman

Performing artists, Indian dance
 Guru Gopinath
 Gopinath Muthukad
 L. Athira Krishna
 Neena Prasad
 Guru Chandrasekharan
 Madavoor Vasudevan Nair
 G. S. Pradeep
 Rajashree Warrier
 Gayathri Govind

Architects
 Laurie Baker - architect, born in England, settled in Trivandrum
 Gopalan Nair Shankar (G. Shankar) - received Padma Shri award in 2011

Science
 V. N. Krishnamurthy - ex-Dy. Director, VSSC; ex-Director, ISRO-UoP Cell
 G. Madhavan Nair - ISRO Chairman
 Thanu Padmanabhan - Indian theoretical physicist

Social Reformers 
 Ayyankali
 Vakkom Moulavi
 Narayana Guru - also a poet
 Chattampi Swamikal - also a poet and prose writer

Writers 
 Kumaran Asan - poet
 A. Ayyappan
 Kilimanoor Chandran
 Ulloor S. Parameswara Iyer - poet
 Sugathakumari - poet
 Gopi Kottoor - poet
 O. N. V. Kurup - poet
 Mali Madhavan Nair
 V. Madhusoodhanan Nair
 George Onakkoor
 Ayyappa Paniker
 C. V. Raman Pillai
 E. V. Krishna Pillai
 Kesari Balakrishna Pillai
 N. Krishna Pillai
 Sreekanteswaram Padmanabha Pillai - author of Shabda Tharavali
 Kilimanoor Ramakanthan
 Sankar
 Sukumar
 Irayimman Thampi
 Bichu Thirumala - Malayalam poet
 Swathi Thirunal
 A. R. Raja Raja Varma
 Vijayakrishnan
 Poovachal Khader - poet

Military personnel 
Radhakrishnan Nair Harshan
Admiral R. Hari Kumar

Jurists 
N. R. Madhava Menon – member of Centre-State Relations Commission of the Government of India; former VC of National Law School of India Univesity, Bangalore and NUJS Kolkata
K. S. Paripoornan – Chief Justice of Patna High Court (1994) and Justice of the Supreme Court of India (1994–1997)

Sports
 K.N. Ananthapadmanabhan - Umpire (ex-Cricketer)
 Aneil Nambiar (born 1984) - Cricketer
Vinu Jose - Footballer
Jobby Justin - Footballer
 Padmanabhan Prasanth - Cricketer
 H.S. Prannoy - Badminton player
 Raiphi Vincent Gomez - Cricketer
 P. Ranganathan - ex-cricketer
 Rohan Prem - Cricketer
 Sanju Samson - Cricketer
 Bijoy Varghese - Footballer
 Britto PM - Footballer

IT
 Kris Gopalakrishnan - CEO of Infosys

Actors and directors 
 Abhirami
 Ahaana Krishna
 Aishwarya Lekshmi
 Alencier Ley Lopez
 Ambika
 Aneesh Ravi
 Anil Murali
 Annie Shaji Kailas
 Appani Sarath
 Arthana Binu
 Arun Kumar Aravind
 Arya Rohit
 Baiju
 Bharat Gopy
 Biju Pappan
 Biju Sopanam
 Chippy
 Deepu Karunakaran
 Devi Ajith
 Gokul Suresh
 Indrajith Sukumaran
 Indrans
 Iniya
 Isha Sharvani
 Jagadish
 Jagathy Sreekumar
 J.C. Daniel
 Joshi
 Kalaranjini
 Kalpana
 Kani Kusruti
 Karamana Janardanan Nair 
 Karthika
 Keerikkadan Jose
 Keerthy Suresh
 Kochu Preman
 K. P. A. C. Azeez
 Krishnakumar
 Krishnankutty Nair
 Lalitha
 Maala Parvathi
 Madhu
 Mahesh Narayanan
 Mallika Sukumaran
 Manikuttan
 Maniyanpilla Raju
 Manjima Mohan
 Manju Pillai
 Menaka Sureshkumar
 Mithun Ramesh
 Mohanlal
 N. L. Balakrishnan
 Namitha Pramod
 Nandhu
 Nayanthara Chakravarthy
 Nazriya Nazim
 Noby Marcose
 Nyla Usha
 Padmini
 Poojappura Ravi
 Prajesh Sen
 Pranav Mohanlal
 Prathap Pothan
 Premkumar
 Prem Nazir
 Prithviraj Sukumaran
 Priyadarshan
 Priyanka Nair
 Radha
 Ragini
 Rajasenan
 Ravi Vallathol
 Rojin Thomas
 R. S. Vimal
 Saji Surendran
 Sajin Baabu
 Sakhi Thomas
 Sangeeth Sivan
 Sankar
 Santosh Sivan
 Sathyan
 Senthil Krishna
 Shafna
 Shaji Kailas
 Shaji N. Karun
 Shobhana
 Shyamaprasad
 Sithara
 Sona Nair
 Suchitra Murali
 Sudheer Karamana
 Sujith Vasudev
 Sukumaran
 Sukumari
 Suraj Venjaramoodu
 Suresh Gopi
 Thikkurissy Sukumaran Nair
 Thulasidas
 Urvashi
 Venu Nagavally
 Vijayakumar
 Vijayasree
 Vinduja Menon

Doctors 
Padmanabhan Palpu
C.O. Karunakaran
M. Krishnan Nair - Founding Director of Regional Cancer Centre
R. Kesavan Nair
A. Marthanda Pillai - neurosurgeon, recipient of 2011 Padma Shri
P. K. R. Warrier
Mohammed Illias Sahadulla

References

 
Lists of people by city in India
People from Thiruvananthapuram, List of
Lists of people from Kerala